Anđela Bulatović née Dragutinović, (born 15 January 1987) is a retired Montenegrin handballer for ŽRK Budućnost Podgorica and the Montenegrin national team.

International honours
EHF Champions League:
Winner: 2012
EHF Cup Winners' Cup:
Winner: 2006
European Championship:
Winner: 2012
Olympic Games:
Silver Medalist: 2012

References

External links

1987 births
Living people
Sportspeople from Podgorica
Montenegrin female handball players
Handball players at the 2012 Summer Olympics
Handball players at the 2016 Summer Olympics
Olympic handball players of Montenegro
Olympic medalists in handball
Olympic silver medalists for Montenegro
Medalists at the 2012 Summer Olympics
Expatriate handball players
Montenegrin expatriate sportspeople in Hungary
Montenegrin expatriate sportspeople in Russia
Montenegrin expatriate sportspeople in Slovenia
Mediterranean Games medalists in handball
Mediterranean Games bronze medalists for Montenegro
Competitors at the 2009 Mediterranean Games